Capital Conference may refer to:

 Capital Area Activities Conference, a high school sports league
 Capital Athletic Conference, an intercollegiate athletic conference